Paradoxus is a genus of moths of the family Yponomeutidae.

Species
Paradoxus caucasica - Friese, 1960
Paradoxus osyridellus - Milliére, 1869

Yponomeutidae